Maske (German for "Mask") is the debut album by German rapper Sido. It reached gold status and sold over 180,000 CDs to date in Germany.

The song "Mein Block" was already released as a remix on Aggro Ansage Nr. 3 in 2003.

Maske was later banned, so after one year, Sido published the album as an "X-version" without the problematic song "Endlich Wochenende", and added two extra songs.

Track list

Charts

Weekly charts

Year-end charts

References 

2004 debut albums
Sido (rapper) albums
German-language albums